John Michael “Mike” Murray (born 1960) is a retired United States Army general, the first commanding general of United States Army Futures Command (AFC), a new four-star Army Command (ACOM) headquartered in Austin, Texas. Murray was previously the G-8, a deputy chief of staff to the Chief of Staff of the United States Army (CSA). As G-8, Murray served as the principal advisor to the CSA  for materiel requirements, as military counterpart to the Assistant Secretary of the Army for acquisition, logistics, and technology (ASA(ALT)).

On 16 July 2018, Murray was nominated for a fourth star and appointment as Army Futures Command's first commanding general; his appointment was confirmed 20 August 2018. He assumed command four days later. On 1 September 2020 General Murray was appointed to lead an in-depth Army 15-6 investigation of those activities and leadership of Fort Hood which led to the murder of Specialist Vanessa Guillen at that installation.

He stepped down as AFC commanding general on 3 December 2021.

Education
Murray was born in Kenton, Ohio, the son of John and Janet Murray. He received his commission as an infantry officer via the Reserve Officers' Training Corps program upon graduation from the Ohio State University in 1982. Throughout his career, Murray has served in leadership positions and commanded from company through division, with various staff assignments at the highest levels of the army.

Military career
Murray has held numerous command positions. His command assignments include: Commanding General Joint Task Force-3; Deputy Commanding General – Support for United States Forces Afghanistan; Commander Bagram Airfield; Commanding General 3rd Infantry Division at Fort Stewart, Georgia; Commander, 3rd Brigade, 1st Cavalry Division, at Fort Hood, Texas while serving on Operation Iraqi Freedom; Commander, 1st Battalion, 18th Infantry, 1st Infantry Division, United States Army Europe and Seventh Army, Germany; Commander, C Company, 1-12th Infantry Battalion, 4th Infantry Division (Mechanized), Fort Carson, Colorado.

Murray also served as the Director, Force Management, the Pentagon; Assistant Deputy Director for Joint Training, J-7, Joint Staff, Suffolk, Virginia; Director, Joint Center for Operational Analysis, United States Joint Forces Command, Suffolk, Virginia; Deputy Commanding General (Maneuver), 1st Cavalry Division, Fort Hood, Texas; Deputy Commanding General (Maneuver), Multi-National Division-Baghdad Operation Iraqi Freedom, Iraq; G-3 (Operations), III Corps, Fort Hood, Texas; Chief of Staff, III Corps and Fort Hood, Fort Hood, Texas; C-3, Multi-National Corps-Iraq, Operation Iraqi Freedom, Iraq; G-3 (Operations), 1st Infantry Division, United States Army Europe and Seventh Army, Germany; Chief, Space Control Protection Section, J-33, United States Space Command, Peterson Air Force Base, Colorado; S-3 (Operations), later Executive Officer, 1st Battalion, 5th Cavalry, 1st Cavalry Division, Fort Hood, Texas; Chief, Plans, G-1, III Corps and Fort Hood, Fort Hood, Texas. General Murray hails from Kenton, Ohio.

Personal life
Murray and his wife, Jane, have three daughters and seven grandchildren.

Awards and decorations

References

United States Army personnel of the Iraq War
United States Army personnel of the War in Afghanistan (2001–2021)
1960 births
Living people
Ohio State University alumni
Recipients of the Defense Superior Service Medal
Recipients of the Distinguished Service Medal (US Army)
Recipients of the Legion of Merit
United States Army generals